Ashtown Ladies Football Club is a Ghanaian professional women's football club based in Kumasi in the Ashanti Region of Ghana. The club features in the Ghana Women’s Premier League. Their rivals are Fabulous Ladies and Kumasi Sports Academy Ladies.

Grounds 
The club plays their home matches at the Wesley College of Education (WESCO) Park in Kumasi.

References

External links 

 Official Website
Ashtown Ladies on Worldfootball.net
 Ashtown Ladies FC on Facebook

Women's football clubs in Ghana